The Kraków Voivodeship, from 1975 to 1984 known as the Kraków Metropolitan Voivodeship, was a voivodeship (province) of the Polish People's Republic from 1975 to 1989, and the Republic of Poland from 1989 to 1998. Its territory included its capital, Kraków and the surrounding municipalities. It was established on 1 June 1975, from the part of the Kraków Voivodeship, and the city of Kraków, which until then acted as a separate administrative division. It existed until 31 December 1998, when it got incorporated into then-established Lesser Poland Voivodeship.Ustawa z dnia 24 lipca 1998 r. o wprowadzeniu zasadniczego trójstopniowego podziału terytorialnego państwa (Dz.U. z 1998 r. nr 96, poz. 603).

Citations

Notes

References 

History of Lesser Poland
History of Kraków
Former voivodeships of Poland (1975–1998)
States and territories established in 1975
States and territories disestablished in 1998
1975 establishments in Poland
1998 disestablishments in Poland